"Live Like That" is a song by Contemporary Christian band Sidewalk Prophets from their second album, Live Like That. It was released on January 24, 2012, as the first single from the album.

Background 
The song was produced by Ian Eskelin, and the song was co-written by David Frey, Ben Glover and Ben McDonald. This song was recorded at Dark Horse Recording Studio in Franklin, Tennessee.

The song is meant to teach believers to live according to how Jesus Christ lived, which means a true reliance on God, and that needs to come from a contrite individual. This song is meant as the primary theme the album is based upon. The band utilized two versus of scripture as inspiration for the album, and those come from Hebrews 12:1-2 and 1 Thessalonians 1:2-6.

Composition 
It has been called a Brit-rock type song that has many questions to be asked of the believers. This is in order for us to live our lives that others see Jesus Christ through them, and choose to follow our Savior.

Release 
"Live Like That" was digitally released as the lead single from Live Like That on January 24, 2012.

Critical reception
Christian Music Zine's Joshua Andre wrote that the song meant "As Christians, living our lives for Jesus and being the light and salt of the world is what ultimately will draw people into the love of God. If we are not living out our faith, how can we expect non-Christians to respect Christianity and Jesus enough to become Christians themselves?" Jesus Freak Hideout's Roger Gelwicks said the song "asks hard questions about the nature of grace to change one's life and pleads for a living testimony for Jesus". New Release Tuesday's Kevin Davis wrote the song "sums up the theme of this great band’s mission which is to reflect Christ in their songs and actions and is a wonderful worship anthem with some Brit-rock guitar work layered throughout.

Videos

Music 
The band has made a music video of the song that in portions contains lyrics.

Individual stories 
Dave Frey, Ben McDonald, Cal Joslin, Justin Nace and Shaun Tomczak shared each one of their respective stories about the song.

Weekly Charts

Certifications

References 

2012 singles
2012 songs
Songs written by Ben Glover
Word Records singles